David Kuo may refer to:

David Kuo (author) (1968–2013), American writer
David Kuo (financial media personality) (born 1956), British financial expert and BBC radio personality